Jānis Jordāns (1 October 1888 – 25 February 1944) was a Latvian athlete. He competed in the men's discus throw at the 1928 Summer Olympics. He died in a Soviet prison camp during World War II.

References

External links
 

1898 births
1944 deaths
Athletes (track and field) at the 1928 Summer Olympics
Latvian male discus throwers
Olympic athletes of Latvia
Place of birth missing
Latvian people who died in Soviet detention
German prisoners of war in World War II held by the Soviet Union